Girlfriend, Boyfriend (also stylized as Gf*Bf) is a 2012 Taiwanese drama film written and directed by Yang Ya-che. The film was released on August 3, 2012.

Of the film, director Yang stated that while he did not intentionally set out to make a "gay movie, but a political one, one which happened to include a gay character"., he further stated that homosexuality and politics "both in fact represent the theme of freedom".

Synopsis
In the 1980s, high school students Aaron, Mabel and Liam are best friends and also caught in a love triangle. As the three friends go through the turbulent times, when social revolution takes hold over martial law, their relationships go through many ups and downs.

Cast
Gwei Lun-mei as Mabel
Joseph Chang as Liam
Rhydian Vaughan as Aaron
Bryan Chang as Sean
Serena Fang as Hsiao-bao, Aaron's wife
Russell Tang as John Hsu, Liam's boyfriend
Ding Ning as Hanako, Mabel's mother 
Nita Lei as Hsiao Yun 
J.C. Lei as Hsiao Shu

Reception
Critical reception for Girlfriend, Boyfriend has been mixed to positive, with review aggregator Rotten Tomatoes giving the film a rating of 67%, based on 12 reviews. The New York Times cited the performance of Gwei Lun-mei as a highlight, saying that she was "by turns brazen and uncertain, fragile and steely". In comparison, the Los Angeles Times panned the film, stating that it "[failed] to connect" and that it "can't balance its story lines of romance and societal change".

Awards and nominations

References

External links

2012 films
2012 drama films
Taiwanese drama films
2010s Mandarin-language films
Taiwanese-language films
Taiwanese LGBT-related films
LGBT-related drama films
Gay-related films
2012 LGBT-related films
Films shot in Tainan